Autoimmunity is an international, peer-reviewed medical journal that covers the pathogenesis, immunology, genetics, and molecular biology of immune and autoimmune responses. In addition, the journal focuses on the autoimmune processes associated with systemic lupus erythematosus, rheumatoid arthritis, Sjögren syndrome, diabetes, multiple sclerosis, and other systemic and organ-specific autoimmune diseases.

Editor 
The editor in chief of Autoimmunity is Paolo Casali, the Donald L Bren Professor of Medicine, Molecular Biology & Biochemistry and Director of the Institute for Immunology at the University of California at Irvine.

References 

Immunology journals
Publications established in 1988
English-language journals